The Heath Parasol is an American single or two seat, open-cockpit, parasol winged, homebuilt monoplane.

Design and development

In 1926, Edward Bayard Heath, a successful American air racer and the owner of an aircraft parts supply business, built the first example of the Heath Parasol, a small, single seat parasol winged airplane using surplus wings from a Thomas-Morse S-4, a World War One fighter trainer, mounted above a steel-tube structure fuselage and powered by a Henderson four-cylinder motorcycle engine. This was the prototype for a series of single and two-seat recreational craft that utilized the Clark Y airfoil. In 1929 Modern Mechanix magazine published the plans in a series and the plans were reprinted in their "1930 Flying & Gliding Manual," which in turn has been reprinted periodically by the EAA (Experimental Aircraft Association).

Although Heath died in 1931 his Parasol designs remained extremely popular, being economical to build and operate as well as easy to fly. Subsequently, the Heath Company of St. Joseph / Benton Harbor Michigan sold nearly 1,000 kits on an installment basis. Fewer than 50 aircraft were factory built, but several hundred were completed and flown by homebuilders during the Great Depression. Heath is remembered today for having helped pioneer the homebuilt aircraft industry and for having introduced the kit concept of packaging the materials needed to build an aircraft.

When it ceased producing aircraft kits to concentrate on electronics (Heathkit), the Heath Company sold the ATC (CAA Aircraft Type Certificate) for the LNA-40 (ATC-487)  to the EAA who continued to sell original plans to potential homebuilders.

Except for the prototype, the wings consist of two solid spruce spars, built up wooden ribs, compression struts, and internal drag and anti-drag bracing. The Parasol's empennage is built of wood, and externally braced. Depending on the model, the fuselage was built of wood, bolted steel tube, or welded steel tube. Wing, empennage, and fuselage are fabric covered.  Two five gallon fuel tanks are typically installed at the root end of each wing, the fuel being gravity fed, sometimes to a small collector tank behind the firewall. The only tools necessary to assemble one of the Parasol kits were a pair of small pliers, screwdriver, hacksaw (with plenty of blades), hammer, small hand drill, chisel, center punch, file and drill.

A variety of powerplants could be fitted, including the factory-supplied converted Henderson Motorcycle  engine (viz.  Heath-Henderson B-4). Post-war, the VW boxer engine was used as well.

Production of an early version was undertaken as early as 1931, in Australia, by the Adcock-Heath Company.

Variants
Home building encourages local variations that blur type definitions for non-certificated versions.

Parallel wing struts. First built 1928. Not Certificated (nor required to be). One seat. 260 pound empty weight. Heath B-4 engine, 27 hp at 2800 rpm.
Parallel wing struts. First built 1929. Not Certificated (nor required to be). One seat. 260 pound empty weight. Heath B-4 engine, 27 hp at 2800 rpm.
V-Parasol Span , various more powerful engines and V-form wing struts.
N-form struts. One or two seat. 450 pound empty weight. Heath B-4 engine, 25 hp at 2800 rpm. Certificated (CAA, ATC-456) June 3, 1932. 
One or two seats. 465 pound empty weight. Door moved to opposite side of fuselage to accommodate hand-propping the clockwise turning  (at 2550 rpm) Continental A40 powerplant. First built 1932. CAA type certificated (ATC-457) June 3, 1932.

Surviving aircraft
 LNB-4 on static display at the New England Air Museum in Windsor Locks, Connecticut.
 An example is on static display at the Museum of Flight in Seattle, Washington.
 LNB-4 is on static display at the EAA Aviation Museum in Oshkosh, Wisconsin.
 LNA-40 is on static display at the Mid-Atlantic Air Museum in Reading, Pennsylvania.
 An example is on display at the Western North Carolina Air Museum in Hendersonville, North Carolina.
 LNA-40 is on static display at the Old Rhinebeck Aerodrome in Red Hook, New York.
 An example is in storage at the Golden Age Air Museum in Bethel, Pennsylvania.
 An example is on display at the Western Antique Aeroplane and Automobile Museum in Hood River, Oregon.
 LNB-4 on static display at the Tri-State Warbird Museum in Batavia, Ohio.
 An example is on display at the Shannon Air Museum in Fredericksburg, Virginia.
 An example is on display at the Moorabbin Air Museum in Melbourne, Victoria.
 An example is on display at the Eagles Mere Air Museum in Laporte, Pennsylvania.

Specifications (Super Parasol)

See also

Heathkit descendant company, maker of electronic kits

Notes

References

Notes

Bibliography

Further reading

External links 

  The Heath Story
 V Parasol 
 "1932 Ad for Heath home built aircraft" Popular Mechanics, August 1932
 Home-Built Heath – Wisconsin Historical Society

1920s United States civil utility aircraft
Homebuilt aircraft
Single-engined tractor aircraft
Parasol
Parasol-wing aircraft
Aircraft first flown in 1926